Helm ( – A Dream) is the first pop album by the Lebanese actress and singer Carole Samaha. It was released in 2003 by EMI Music Arabia. The Rough Guide to World Music: Africa & The Middle East calls it a "deliciously neat production". The song "Ghali Aayi" from the album became a hit. Following the release of this album, Carole Samaha won the "Best Female Newcomer" award at the Arab Music Awards. She also received the "Best Polyvalent talent (actress and singer)" 2003 Murex d'Or, while the song "Ettalaa fiyi" got the Murex d'Or for "Best Female Romantic Song".

The CD also contains a video clip with the official video for the song "Habib Albi".

References 

 Album liner notes
 Helm at Allmusic.

Carole Samaha albums
2003 albums